Paquchi (Aymara for reddish, light brown, also spelled Pacuche) is a mountain in the Cordillera Central in the Andes of Peru which reaches a height of approximately . It is located in the Lima Region, Yauyos Province, Huantán District.

References 

Mountains of Peru
Mountains of Lima Region